Shiraz International Airport  is an international airport located in Shiraz, Iran. It is the main international airport of Fars province and southern region of Iran. It is also the largest airport in the southern region of Iran.

After undergoing renovation and redevelopment work in 2005, it was identified as the second most reliable and modern airport in Iran, after Tehran International Airport, in flight safety, including electronic and navigation control systems of its flight tower.

Terminals
Shiraz International Airport has two main passenger terminals which are connected to each other.

Domestic Terminal 
Domestic Terminal or Terminal 1 is the older and larger than the other terminal, and exclusively handles domestic flights within Iran.

International Terminal 
International Terminal or Terminal 2 is used for all scheduled and charter international flights. An international terminal is under construction for international flights, and was due to be built by 2024. After its completion the current International Terminal will be used for Hajj flights.

Airlines and destinations

The following airlines operate passenger flights at Shiraz International Airport:

Notes
According to Iranian laws direct passenger flights to Antalya are banned, so Pegasus Airlines and SunExpress seasonal charter flights from Shiraz to Antalya have a stopover in Adana. However, these airlines do not carry local traffic between Shiraz and Adana. The return flights also have the same conditions. This law applies only to passenger flights and does not include VIP, cargo or ferry flights.

Accidents and incidents
On 15 June 1971, Douglas C-47A EP-ADG of the Air Taxi Co was damaged beyond economic repair in an accident at Shiraz Airport.
On 14 December 2018, a Boeing 737 MAX 8 LN-BKE, operated by Norwegian Air Shuttle, flight DY 1933, delivered only in October 2018, made a forced landing at Shiraz Airport after a technical failure with one of its two engines.  The passengers and crew disembarked and the next day continued their journey originating in Dubai, UAE to Oslo, Norway.  Until February 2019, the aircraft had not yet been recovered due to strict technical embargoes by the United States against the state of Iran.  By the end of January 2019, the status of LN-BKE had changed to "stored". On 22 February, the aircraft was finally recovered and flown to Sweden. It was then transferred to Norwegian Air Sweden and its registration was then changed to SE-RYB. The aircraft was then stored again when all Boeing 737 MAX's were grounded worldwide.

See also
Iran Civil Aviation Organization
Transport in Iran
List of airports in Iran
List of the busiest airports in Iran
List of airlines of Iran

References

External links 
Shiraz Shahid Dastgheib International Airport

Airports in Iran
Buildings and structures in Shiraz
Transportation in Fars Province